Of Montreal is an American indie pop band from Athens, Georgia. It was founded by frontperson Kevin Barnes in 1996, named after a failed romance between Barnes and a woman "of Montreal". The band is identified as part of the Elephant 6 collective. Throughout its existence, of Montreal's musical style has evolved considerably and drawn inspiration from 1960s psychedelic pop acts.

History

1996–1998
Kevin Barnes founded of Montreal, allegedly naming it for a failed romance with a woman from Montreal, Quebec. Barnes was the only member of the group prior to their relocation to Athens, Georgia. There, they met Derek Almstead (Circulatory System, Marshmallow Coast, Elf Power) and Bryan Poole, who also performs as The Late B.P. Helium. Together, they recorded their debut album, Cherry Peel, and subsequent releases The Bird Who Ate the Rabbit's Flower and The Bedside Drama: A Petite Tragedy.

After production on The Gay Parade, the band's third album, began in 1998, Poole left the band to focus on his involvement with Elf Power, another Elephant Six band.  Barnes then recruited James Husband and Dottie Alexander, who had been performing together as Lightning Bug vs. Firefly.  Derek moved from drums to bass, and Marshmallow Coast's Andy Gonzales joined soon after. Prior to the release of The Gay Parade in 1999, of Montreal released a number of singles and a re-release of The Bird Who Continues to Eat the Rabbit's Flower.

1999–2006
Following the release of The Gay Parade, the band signed with Kindercore Records, and in 2001, the concept album Coquelicot Asleep in the Poppies: A Variety of Whimsical Verse was released.  

Kindercore Records would fold shortly after the release of Aldhils Arboretum, and Andy and Derek left the band. Barnes took to writing and performing their 2004 album Satanic Panic in the Attic mostly by themselves. It was released by Polyvinyl Records.

In 2005 The Sunlandic Twins was released.

2007–2012

Barnes recorded most of the band's 2007 release, Hissing Fauna, Are You the Destroyer?, by themselves while living in Norway and Athens, Georgia. They also released a companion CD to Hissing Fauna, Are You the Destroyer? called Icons, Abstract Thee.  In 2007, Kevin Barnes performed five songs nude during a performance in Las Vegas. In Paris, they did a Take-Away Show acoustic video session shot by Vincent Moon.

Of Montreal's next album, Skeletal Lamping, was released on October 21, 2008. It was released in ten different formats, including conventional CD and vinyl, as well as T-shirts, button sets, wall decals, tote bags, and a paper lantern, the latter formats complete with a digital download code for the album. All items for the collection were designed by The Bee With Wheels (David Barnes) and Gemini Tactics (Nina Barnes). In an essay addressing the concept behind the album's release, Kevin Barnes stated, "We feel that there's no reason to produce another object that just sits on a shelf. We only want to produce objects that have a function and that can be treasured for their singularness." In an interview with NPR, Kevin Barnes revealed that the concept of the CD may be going the way of the 8-track in favor of MP3 downloads. David Barnes joked that fans would buy the album via MP3 download and the version that comes with an amazing sandwich.

In August 2009, the band contributed a T-shirt design, which was printed and sold through the Yellow Bird Project website to raise money for the St. Judes Children's Hospital. The shirt was designed by David Barnes.

During this era, the band lent its songs many times to commercials, television programs, and films. The song "Wraith Pinned to the Mist (And Other Games)" can be heard on radio and television commercials (with words changed) for an advertisement for Outback Steakhouse.  Similarly, their song "Every Day Feels Like Sunday" was used in television commercials for NASDAQ. "A Sentence of Sorts In Kongsvinger" was used in a Comcast commercial. "Gronlandic Edit" was used for a T-Mobile commercial which also featured the band as actors.

Teaming up with Jon Brion, Kevin Barnes traveled to Ocean Way Recording to record False Priest.

On October 25, 2011 of Montreal released a Cassette Box Set of all 10 full-length albums via Joyful Noise Recordings. The release was limited to 500 hand-numbered copies, and housed in a custom-built wooden box (screen-printed with original artwork from David Barnes). Each of the 10 cassettes were pressed on multi-colored tape shells and included original album art. Like their previous cassette release, MP3 download was included.

Kevin Barnes had revealed some information on the following album in an interview with Pitchfork Media. On October 20, 2011, Barnes announced that the next album was complete. In November 2011, the band released a new track titled "Wintered Debts" via the band's Soundcloud site, a track off the new album Paralytic Stalks. In January 2012, of Montreal released "Dour Percentage," the first single from the new album. Paralytic Stalks was released on February 7, 2012. 

On November 12, 2012, the band created a Kickstarter page to help in the funding of a career-spanning, feature-length documentary called Song Dynasties. The film will consist of footage collected throughout of Montreal's entire career, including touring and studio sessions, as well as other musicians such as Andrew VanWyngarden of MGMT. The tentative release window for Song Dynasties was announced as March 2013. An update regarding the documentary's progress was posted on the band's Facebook site in February.

2013–present

On April 25, 2013, of Montreal posted an announcement on their Facebook page stating that a new album entitled Lousy with Sylvianbriar had been completed.  The post went into detail about the album's conception, including that Barnes' writing occurred while on a "self imposed isolation experiment in San Francisco" in early 2013. They were influenced by Sylvia Plath, the Grateful Dead, Neil Young, and the Flying Burrito Brothers in their writing. The album was recorded with a new lineup of musicians, including Jojo Glidewell, Nicolas Dobbratz, Bennett Lewis, and Bob Parins, with Clayton Rychlik and Kevin Barnes as the only returning members. The album and subsequent tour also featured Rebecca Cash on vocals. Lousy with Sylvianbriar was released on October 8, 2013. On July 10, 2013, the band released the first single from the album, entitled "Fugitive Air." On July 31, 2013, they announced that they would be touring their new album in October and November. 
This tour featured the same musicians that performed on the album, instead of longtime band members such as Bryan Poole and Dottie Alexander.

By means of a Facebook post and an interview with Barnes, conducted by Stereogum, of Montreal's album Aureate Gloom was announced. The record was influenced by "the mid-to-late 1970s music scene in New York," including bands such as Talking Heads and Led Zeppelin. The album captures Barnes' emotions borne from their separation from their wife of 11 years and its aftermath. They described the album as being "all over the place musically", lending to its reflection of their mindset during the time of its creation. The album was released March 3, 2015.

In August 2016, of Montreal released Innocence Reaches, which incorporated new, EDM-inspired sounds, as well as the progressive rock sounds of the previous two albums. For the tour following the album's release, bassist Davey Pierce returned to the band, replacing Bob Parins.

On January 13, 2017, of Montreal released a new EP by surprise, entitled Rune Husk. On March 9, 2018, the album White Is Relic/Irrealis Mood was released on Polyvinyl, with singer Barnes explaining that the sound was influenced by "extended dance mixes" from the 1980s.

The band released its sixteenth studio album, UR FUN, on January 17, 2020.

Of Montreal released its seventeenth studio album, I Feel Safe with You, Trash, on March 5, 2021, and its eighteenth Freewave Lucifer F<ck F^ck F>ck on July 29, 2022.

Members

Current line-up
 Kevin Barnes – singer, multi-instrumentalist, songwriter (1996–present)
 Clayton Rychlik – drums, keys, guitar, bass (2010–present)
 Jojo Glidewell – keys (2013–present)
 Davey Pierce – bass (2007–2013, 2015–present)
 Nicolas Dobbratz – keys, percussion, bass, guitar (2010–2013, 2015–present)

Past members
 Bryan Poole – guitar (1996–1998; 2004–2013)
 Derek Almstead – drums (1996–1998) – bass (1998–2003)
 Dottie Alexander – keys (1998–2013)
 James Huggins – drums, keys, bass (1998–2010)
 Andy Gonzalez – guitar (1998–2003)
 Julian Koster – various (1998–2001)
 Jason NeSmith – guitar (2004–2005)
 Nina Grøttland – bass (2004)
 Matthew Paris Dawson – bass (2005–2007)
 Ahmed Gallab – drums (2008–2009)
 Thayer Sarrano – keys (2010–2012)
 Kaoru Ishibashi – violin, keys (2010–2012)
 Zac Colwell – woodwinds, keys, guitar (2012)
 Rebecca Cash – vocals, keys, bass, percussion (2013–2014)
 Bob Parins – bass (2013-2015)
 Bennett Dean Lewis – keys, guitar (2013–2015)

Timeline

Side projects
True to the style of most Elephant Six recording artists, of Montreal's members have been in a variety of side projects with other bands:
Kevin Barnes played keyboard for "The Difference in the Shades" on the Bright Eyes' album Letting Off the Happiness.
Kevin Barnes, Nina Barnes, and David Barnes did a comedy tour called "A Pollinaire Rave".
The band performed as the backing band for Marshmallow Coast on record and on tour.
Dottie Alexander released the song "The You I Created" on the Kindercore singles club, under the pseudonym My First Keyboard; of Montreal acted as her backing band.
Bryan Poole has a solo career as the Late B.P. Helium.
Davey Pierce and Travis Adams from the now-defunct emo band My Hotel Year, created the band Inkwell in 2004.
James Huggins released A Parallax I under the name "James Husband" which featured a cover of The Beatles' "We Can Work it Out".
Ahmed Gallab has a solo career as Sinkane. He has played in the bands Born Ruffians, Caribou, Yeasayer, and Eleanor Friedberger. He is also the music director and band leader of the Atomic Bomb! Band.
Derek Almstead has worked with many artists as a musician and engineer including his collaboration with Andy Gonzales M Coast, Elf Power, and Circulatory System.
The group worked with artist Janelle Monáe on a track called "Make The Bus" in her 2010 LP The ArchAndroid (Suites II and III).
Kevin co-produced the 2012 Solange Knowles single "Losing You".
K Ishibashi has a solo career as Kishi Bashi and toured as a supporting act with Sondre Lerche in 2011.
Kevin Barnes produced and played on the album  Marble Mouth by Pillar Point.

Discography

Studio albums
1997 Cherry Peel (Bar/None)
1998 The Bedside Drama: A Petite Tragedy (Kindercore)
1999 The Gay Parade (Bar/None)
2001 Coquelicot Asleep in the Poppies: A Variety of Whimsical Verse (Kindercore)
2002 Aldhils Arboretum (Kindercore)
2004 Satanic Panic in the Attic (Polyvinyl)
2005 The Sunlandic Twins (Polyvinyl)
2007 Hissing Fauna, Are You the Destroyer? (Polyvinyl, No. 72 US)
2008 Skeletal Lamping (Polyvinyl, No. 38 US)
2010 False Priest (Polyvinyl, No. 34 US)
2012 Paralytic Stalks (Polyvinyl, No. 121 US)
2013 Lousy With Sylvianbriar (Polyvinyl, No. 115 US)
2015 Aureate Gloom (Polyvinyl)
2016 Innocence Reaches (Polyvinyl)
2018 White Is Relic/Irrealis Mood (Polyvinyl)
2020 Ur Fun (Polyvinyl)
2021 I Feel Safe with You, Trash (Sybaritic Peer)
2022 Freewave Lucifer F<ck F^ck F>ck (Polyvinyl)

Notes

References

External links

 – official site

Paralytic Stalks review by Seth Katz for NthWord Shorts, February 8, 2012
Joyful Noise Recordings

 
Polyvinyl Record Co. artists
Musical groups from Athens, Georgia
The Elephant 6 Recording Company artists
Musical collectives
Neo-psychedelia groups
Indie pop groups from Georgia (U.S. state)
Indie rock musical groups from Georgia (U.S. state)
Suicide Squeeze Records artists
LGBT-themed musical groups
Psychedelic pop music groups
Joyful Noise Recordings artists
Bar/None Records artists
Low Transit Industries artists
1996 establishments in Georgia (U.S. state)
Musical groups established in 1996